Your Choice is the eighth extended play (EP) by South Korean boy band Seventeen, released through Pledis Entertainment on June 18, 2021, eight months after its predecessor, Semicolon (2020). The album comprises six tracks of a variety of genres, including the lead single, "Ready to Love". Overall, the album has a mostly calm sound, depicting the nature of love.

Commercial performance 
Upon its release, it sold 1.36 million copies in the first week. This broke the band's record, which had been previously set with Heng:garæ, as well as the record for all albums released in 2021. The EP also marks Seventeen's first entry on the US Billboard 200.

Track listing

Accolades

Charts

Weekly charts

Year-end charts

References 

2021 EPs
Korean-language EPs
Seventeen (South Korean band) EPs
Hybe Corporation EPs